Gary Shoefield is a television and film producer.

Shoefield was portrayed in the 2006 film 'Alien Autopsy' by Ant McPartlin having been involved with the now infamous faked footage from the beginning with business partner and friend Ray Santilli. Shoefield’s son is Luke Brandon Field best known for playing Christoph in Jojo Rabbit (film) and in the upcoming The Flash (film)

Career
Shoefield was involved in various roles with children's television programmes, such as Pinky and Perky, Tales of the Riverbank and The Magic Roundabout.

In 1990 he collaborated with the F.A.B. group which had a few hits by sampling movie dialogues to electronic music. They are best known for Thunderbirds Are Go which reached No. 5 in the UK Top 40.

For a time he also managed television actor Patrick McGoohan. He has also worked with self-described psychic Derek Acorah, having launched him on TV in the UK.

Shoefield has worked for Arista Records, Disney, Warner Bros., PolyGram, EMI and ITV.

Footnotes

British television producers
British film producers
Living people
Year of birth missing (living people)